Flying Post First Nation is an Ojibway and Cree First Nation band government in Nipigon, Ontario. It has a reserve called Flying Post 73.

History

Reserves were first established between the government and First Nations in Northern Ontario through the signing of the Treaty #9 document in 1905 and 1906 and later additional adhesions in 1929 and 1930. In 1906, Flying Post lands were identified in a ‘Schedule Of Reserves’ in the Treaty 9 document and listed the First Nation lands as follows – '‘In the province of Ontario, commencing at a point half a mile south of Six-Mile Rapids, on the east side of Ground Hog River, thence south a distance of four miles, and of sufficient depth to give an area of twenty-three square miles.’' In the 1960s, Flying Post First Nation members began to organize themselves during the formation of First Nation political organizations such as Nishnawbe-Aski Nation (NAN). During this period they re-established themselves as a First Nation entity and elected a Chief and Council to represent their people.

References

Indian reserves in Ontario
Ojibwe reserves in Ontario
Swampy Cree